Mehrab Hossain (born 22 September 1978) is a Bangladeshi cricketer who played in nine Test matches and 18 One Day Internationals from 1998 to 2003. By scoring 101 against Zimbabwe at Bangabandhu National Stadium at Dhaka in 1999, he became the first Bangladeshi cricketer to score a century in ODIs.

Mehrab is associated with an extremely unfortunate incident. On 20 February 1998, Raman Lamba, formerly a Delhi swashbuckling opening batsman, fielding close to the bat, copped one on the skull off the bat of Mehrab Hossain. Lamba died of the injury later in the day. Mehrab was deeply affected by the incident and took a spell off the game. He came back later to play for Bangladesh.

External links
Memories of a Dhaka hero – Crincinfo

Bangladeshi cricketers
1978 births
Living people
Bangladesh Test cricketers
Bangladesh One Day International cricketers
Cricketers at the 1999 Cricket World Cup
Dhaka Division cricketers
Cricketers from Dhaka